Inspector Sun and the Curse of the Black Widow is a 2022 computer-animated film and family-oriented mystery thriller directed by Julio Soto Gúrpide from a screenplay by Rocco Pucillo.

Plot 
A noirish fiction set in a seaplane from Shanghai to San Francisco in 1934, the plot follows anthropomorphic spider Inspector Sun in a mission against his foe, the Red Locust, with the mystery vis-à-vis the death of Dr. Spindelthorp as a backdrop.

Production 
The script by Rocco Pucillo won the 2013 Samuel Goldwyn Writing Award. The film is a The Thinklab Media and Gordon Box production, in association with 3Doubles Producciones, the participation of RTVE, support from ICAA,  funding from ICO and Navarre's Sodena and collaboration from Epic Games. Ronny Chieng voiced Sun in the international version. Fernando Velázquez scored the film.

Release 
Kapers Animation handled worldwide sales. Distributed by Tripictures, the film was theatrically released in Spain on 28 December 2022.

Reception 
Juan Pando of Fotogramas rated the film 4 out of 5 stars, highlighting the character of Sun's aid.

Accolades 

|-
| align = "center" rowspan = "2" | 2023 || 78th CEC Medals || colspan = "2" | Best Animated Film ||  || align = "center" | 
|-
| 37th Goya Awards || colspan = "2" | Best Animated Film ||  || 
|}

See also 
 List of Spanish films of 2022

References 

Spanish computer-animated films
2020s Spanish films
Spanish mystery thriller films
Spanish neo-noir films
Animated films about animals
Films scored by Fernando Velázquez
Films about spiders
Films set in 1934
Films set in Shanghai
Spanish aviation films
2022 computer-animated films
2020s mystery thriller films